KIXK may refer to:

 KIXK (FM), a defunct radio station (102.3 FM) formerly licensed to serve Wheatland, Missouri, United States
 KBEX (FM), a radio station (96.1 FM) licensed to serve Dalhart, Texas, United States, which held the call sign KIXK from 2008 to 2010